Nikola Mutafchiev (10 August 1904 in Stara Zagora – 24 March 1963) was a Bulgarian footballer who played as a forward for Levski Sofia and Bulgaria during the 1920s. His elder brother Dimitar Mutafchiev also was a footballer.

Career 
For six seasons from 1921 to 1927, Mutafchiev scored 50 goals in 52 games for Levski. 

He played for the national team in the Bulgaria's first international match against Austria in Vienna on 21 May 1924. Mutafchiev also participated at the 1924 Summer Olympics. On 10 April 1925, he became the first player to score for Bulgaria in a 2–1 friendly loss against Turkey.

Career statistics

Honours 
 Levski Sofia
 Bulgarian State Football Championship
 Runners-up (1): 1925

 Sofia Championship
 Champion (3): 1923, 1924, 1925

 Ulpia Serdika Cup
 Winner (1): 1926

References

External links 

1904 births
1963 deaths
Bulgarian footballers
Bulgaria international footballers
Footballers at the 1924 Summer Olympics
PFC Levski Sofia players
Association football forwards
Sportspeople from Stara Zagora
Olympic footballers of Bulgaria